Taiynsha is a district of North Kazakhstan Region in northern Kazakhstan. The administrative center of the district is the town of Taiynsha. Population:

Demography

Kazakh 26.8% (15.7k)

Polish 22.4% (13.2k)

Russian 21.7% (12.7k)

Ukrainian 12.7% (7.4k)

German 9.9% (5.8k)

Belarusian 3.2% (1.9k)

Geography 
Part of Shaglyteniz lake is located in the district.

References

Districts of Kazakhstan
North Kazakhstan Region